18-20a Munn Street is a heritage-listed row of terrace houses located at 18, 18a, 20, 20a Munn Street, in the inner city Sydney suburb of Millers Point in the City of Sydney local government area of New South Wales, Australia. It was added to the New South Wales State Heritage Register on 2 April 1999.

History 
Millers Point is one of the earliest areas of European settlement in Australia, and a focus for maritime activities. This Federation style terrace is one of two remaining terraces of an original group of six built  1911, the others having been demolished for the port expansion at Darling Harbour. It was first tenanted by the NSW Department of Housing in 1986.

Description 

A group of four houses (upper and ground level dwellings), well-integrated with the Palisade Hotel site. Main entrances to the south are accessible from a shared verandah walkway. Side yards are located on Bettington Street. Art nouveau fretwork and cast iron fencing are particularly noteworthy.

The terraces are of face brick with sandstone trim to doors and windows (four pane), and with a two-storey verandah with timber balustrading.

Heritage listing 
This group of early twentieth century terrace houses was previously larger, some being demolished for Darling Harbour Port expansion.

It is part of the Millers Point Conservation Area, an intact residential and maritime precinct. It contains residential buildings and civic spaces dating from the 1830s and is an important example of nineteenth-century adaptation of the landscape.

18-20a Munn Street was listed on the New South Wales State Heritage Register on 2 April 1999.

See also 

Australian residential architectural styles

References

Bibliography

Attribution

External links

 

New South Wales State Heritage Register sites located in Millers Point
Federation style architecture
Terraced houses in Sydney
Articles incorporating text from the New South Wales State Heritage Register
1910s establishments in Australia
Houses completed in the 20th century
New South Wales Heritage Database
Articles incorporating text from the New South Wales Heritage Database
Millers Point Conservation Area